The Men's 800m event at the 2010 South American Games was held on March 21 at 18:20.

Medalists

Records

The following records were set during the competition:

Results
Results were published.

Intermediate times:

See also
2010 South American Under-23 Championships in Athletics

References

External links
Report

800 M